"Playing in the Band" is a Grateful Dead song. The lyrics were written by Robert Hunter and rhythm guitarist Bob Weir composed the music, with some assistance from percussionist Mickey Hart. The song first emerged in embryonic form on the self-titled 1971 live album Grateful Dead. It then appeared in a more polished form on Ace, Bob Weir's first solo album (which included every Grateful Dead member except Ron "Pigpen" McKernan).

It has since become one of the best-known Grateful Dead numbers and a standard part of their repertoire. According to Deadbase X, it ranks fourth on the list of songs played most often in concert by the band with 581 performances.

In the Grateful Dead's live repertoire, all songs featured musical improvisation and many featured extended instrumental solos; but certain key songs were used as starting points for serious collective musical improvisation--the entire band creating spontaneously, all at once.  In this regard "Playing in the Band" was of major importance, second only to "Dark Star".   During "Playing in the Band" the Grateful Dead would play the planned verses and choruses of the song itself; then they would improvise and explore brand new musical territory, sometimes for twenty minutes or more; and then the chorus would usually be reprised, to bring the song to its end.  Sometimes during these extended "jams", the band would even perform other entire songs, before at last coming back around to the final chorus from "Playing in the Band".  

Its performance on 21 May, 1974 at the Hec Edmundson Pavilion in Seattle has been cited as the longest uninterrupted performance of a single song in the Grateful Dead's history, clocking in at 46 minutes and 32 seconds.  It was released in 2018 on the boxset Pacific Northwest '73–'74: The Complete Recordings and as its own LP.

Origins
The instrumental break of "Playing in the Band" was introduced as early as the February 19, 1969 "Celestial Synapse" show at the Fillmore West, in which it appears somewhat indistinct from the preceding and following jams. The completed song debuted (along with five others) on February 18, 1971 at the Capitol Theatre in Port Chester, New York. "The Main Ten" appears on Dick's Picks Volume 16, from their performance at the Fillmore West on November 8, 1969. On that set, it appears in the middle of "Caution (Do Not Stop On Tracks)".

During a Bob Weir and Wolf Bros concert livestream on February 12, 2021, Weir credited David Crosby with the composition of the main riff. Weir stated, "David Crosby came up with the seminal lick... and then he left. We were out at Mickey's barn. So Mickey said, 'Make a song out of that'. Next day, I had it".

References

External links
  The Annotated "Playing In The Band" lyrics and commentary

1971 songs
Grateful Dead songs
Songs with lyrics by Robert Hunter (lyricist)
Songs written by Bob Weir